"To Sir with Love" is the theme from James Clavell's 1967 film To Sir, with Love. The song was performed by British singer and actress Lulu (who also starred in the film), and written by Don Black and Mark London (husband of Lulu's longtime manager Marion Massey). Mickie Most produced the record, with Mike Leander arranging and conducting. The song peaked at the top of the Billboard Hot 100, and became the best-selling single of 1967 in the United States.

Background
At the time, it made Lulu only the second British female artist to top the US charts during the listing's Rock era after Petula Clark's "Downtown" in 1965—and third in the overall history of the US charts after "Downtown" and Vera Lynn's "Auf Wiederseh'n Sweetheart" in 1952—and so far the first of two Scottish female solo artists to achieve the feat. Sheena Easton became the second when she topped the US charts with "Morning Train (9 to 5)" in May 1981.

For 44 years, Lulu and Easton were the only Scottish solo artists to have topped the Billboard Hot 100—a record that ended when Calvin Harris topped the chart alongside Rihanna on their collaboration "We Found Love" in November 2011.

Oscar Nomination
The film's director, James Clavell and Lulu's manager Marion Massey were angered and disappointed when the title song was not included in the nominations for the Academy Award for Best Original Song at the 40th Academy Awards in 1968. Clavell and Massey raised a formal objection to the exclusion, but to no avail.

Chart performance
"To Sir With Love" was initially recorded by Lulu (with The Mindbenders, who also acted in the film). It was released as a single in the United States in 1967 and in October reached No. 1 on the Billboard Hot 100, where it remained for five weeks. The single ranked No. 1 in Billboard's year-end chart, though the Monkees' "I'm a Believer", which debuted in December 1966 and spent most of its chart life in 1967, was the overall bigger hit. ("I'm a Believer" was ranked No. 5 on the same year-end chart of the same year.) It became a gold record.

Canada's RPM magazine put the song at No. 2 for the year 1967. "To Sir with Love" did not chart in the UK, as it appeared only as a B-side to "Let's Pretend" (released in the UK on 23 June 1967), which reached No. 11 on the UK Singles Chart.

Charts

Weekly charts

Year-end charts

All-time charts

Cover versions
Herbie Mann's instrumental rendition charted concurrently with Lulu's run on the pop chart, reaching No. 93 on the US Billboard Hot 100 and No. 11 on the Adult Contemporary chart.
Madeline Bell covered the song on her 1968 album Doin' Things.
The Jackson 5 covered it during the Diana Ross Presents The Jackson 5 sessions in 1969.
The Residents recorded a cover of the song for the album The Third Reich 'n Roll as a part of "Swastikas on Parade"
Al Green covered the song on his 1978 album, Truth N' Time.
In 1983, American actress Vicki Sue Robinson released a version of the song that peaked at number seven on the Australian Kent Music Report and was the 58th biggest selling single in Australia in 1984.
New Zealand singer Ngaire Fuata covered the song which was released as a single in 1990 where it spent 5 weeks at No. 1 on the New Zealand Singles Chart. It was included in her self-titled debut album Ngaire released in 1991.
Soul Asylum sang the song with Lulu on their MTV Unplugged show.
Natalie Merchant, as part of 10,000 Maniacs, recorded a cover with Michael Stipe (of R.E.M.) at the MTV Rock n' Roll Inaugural Ball in 1993 to be released later as part of their Campfire Songs compilation album.
Susanna Hoffs covered the song on her self-titled solo album.
The Trash Can Sinatras recorded a version for their 1996 album A Happy Pocket. It was released later that year as the fourth and final single from the album reaching number 88 in the UK singles chart.
Jann Arden released it on Happy? on 23 September 1997 in Canada and 8 June 1998 in the United States as a bonus track on international release.
Will Friedle, as Eric Matthews, sings a humorous rendition of the song to a retiring Mr. Feeny (William Daniels) in "Graduation", the season five finale of Boy Meets World which aired May 15, 1998.
Brother-and-sister duo Melky Sedeck covered the song on their album Sister & Brother, released in 1999.
Chaka Khan recorded a version accompanied by the London Symphony Orchestra for her 2004 album ClassiKhan.
Scottish singer Midge Ure also did a version from his 2008 cover versions CD 10.
The cast of Glee covered the song in the final episode of the first season of the TV show, which aired on 8 June 2010.
Katey Sagal & The Forest Rangers recorded their version of the song in 2012 for 12th episode of the 5th season of the TV show, The Sons of Anarchy.
The ReWlettes recorded a version and released video January 2021.
Susan Cowsill (of The Cowsills) performs an acapella version as well as a version backed by her siblings and husband during live performances.
Lesley Gore covered the song on her shelved, but soon re-released album, Magic Colors.

References

External links
 Lyrics of this song
 

1967 singles
2007 singles
Billboard Hot 100 number-one singles
Cashbox number-one singles
Epic Records singles
Lulu (singer) songs
Tina Arena songs
Vicki Sue Robinson songs
Number-one singles in New Zealand
RPM Top Singles number-one singles
Song recordings produced by Mickie Most
Songs with lyrics by Don Black (lyricist)
Songs about school
Songs about educators
1967 songs
EMI Records singles